General Floyd may refer to:

John B. Floyd (1806–1863), Confederate States Army brigadier general 
William Floyd (1734–1821), Suffolk County Militia major general in the American Revolutionary War
Sir John Floyd, 1st Baronet (1748–1818), British Army general

See also
DeLancey Floyd-Jones (1826–1902), U.S. Army brigadier general